A Demon's Game: Episode 1 is an action indie 3D video game, developed and published by RP Studios for Microsoft Windows.

Gameplay
The game features the player as the protagonist, Daniel, who quests to find his lost wife and fights demons to save her.

Development
The duration of game's development was a year and a half and four chapters/episodes are intended to be included.

See also
List of PC games

References

2017 video games
Action video games
Indie video games
Video games about demons
Windows games